The Academy of Technical Training (Arabic: أكاديمية التدريب الفني) is a privately owned institution which provides training programs in aviation security and safety, air traffic control, and management of aircraft accidents. The curriculum and courses are accredited and certified by the General Civil Aviation Authority.

Profile
The academy provides professional training for military and civilian students, ranging from basic to advanced as well as recurrent levels. All courses are taught in accordance with international quality standards. The academy was founded in 2004. By the end of 2011, it had trained 4800 students.

The academy is located in Dubai Knowledge Village. Students that complete each course and reach a satisfactory standard are awarded a certificate of completion that also indicates their level of achievement.

All courses are taught in English but the academy has the ability to instruct courses in Arabic, if required.

Courses
 Diploma in Aviation Management - The Aviation Management and Safety is an essential course for this diploma program which provides information for building an aviation safety program, prevention methodology and the economics of aviation safety in the aviation industry. It is for people who work or would like to work in aviation including pilots, maintenance technicians, air traffic controllers, engineers, airport managers, avionics specialists and others in aviation related fields.

Aviation Courses:
 Aircraft Accident Investigation & Management trains students to manage and conduct aircraft accident investigations. The course information includes responsibilities and working relationship of various organisations, wreckage recovery, site security, recording of evidence, accident photography, accident investigation procedures, and writing of accident reports. This course also provides the students with the knowledge to manage a safety management system, Human Factors and operational Risk Management. A field exercise is conducted on the course.
 Advance Aircraft Accident Investigation & Management course trains personnel to an advanced level in investigation of aircraft accidents. This is carried out in accordance with ICAO and FAA regulations and covers investigation techniques, accident reporting forms, and the effective management of resources (time, personnel, funds, etc.). The course trains the participant on how to coordinate with Police, Civil Defense and hospitals.
 Aeromedical and First Aid Training course provides the candidates with an understanding of the management of medical incidents. The topic of hypoxia is covered in depth. 
 Air Traffic Controller - Assistant ICAO-051 course provides candidates with an understanding of aviation and airport operations and familiarizes them with the technical and practical subjects that will concern them in their in Air Traffic Control Assistant position.
 Air Traffic Controller - Tower ICAO-052 course trains potential Air Traffic Control Officers in the theory, principles and practice of aerodrome control. Students are given tuition and taught skills in accordance with ICAO standards and recommended practices.
 Air Traffic Controller - Radar ICAO-053-054 course provides students with an understanding of the principles and practice of approach controls (both non - radar and radar). This is done to standards in excess of the minimum ICAO standards.
 Aircraft Accident Photography provides training in aircraft accident photography with emphasis on techniques in digital and video photography. 
 Airport Security - ICAO-STP123 course covers airport security.
 Aviation English (level 4) course provides participants with English to the ICAO level 4 standard. At the end of the course the students would be preferred to archive the certificate of ICAO English level 4.
 Aviation Management course provides the students knowledge of Risk Management, Total Quality Management and supply Chain Management. After this course the participants would be able to manage aviation safety programs.
 Crew Resource Management provides the aircrew with knowledge of human factors. Mental and physical limitation of the human beings are discussed. Error and Error Management is the core topic. The course meets the requirements of ICAO.
 Electronic Warfare course provides knowledge in the concepts of electronic warfare in military service.
 First Line Maintenance Safety provides the students with knowledge on safety aspects that are to be observed while working in First Line Units. Teaching includes ground safety, human behavior, tool control, accident prevention, electrical safety, flight line and traffic safety, fire protection and control and aero medical safety.
 Flight Dispatcher course will give the participants knowledge of airline general operations, flight operations and understand meteorological, logistical and other elements of flight planning.
 Flight Safety course provides participants with knowledge to become Managers in an aircraft safety environment. Teaching includes management, communication principles and human behavior, aerodynamics, aircraft structure, materials and powerplant. Flight safety concepts, safety program and inspection program are taught. The course is completed by an introduction to pre-accident plans, accident investigation analysis and reporting with applications to civil and military aircraft.
 Ground Safety course provides participants with the knowledge to become Managers in a ground safety environment. Students are taught ground safety, human behavior, shop and tool safety, accident prevention, equipment, facility and radiation safety, flight line and traffic safety, fire protection and control.
 Initial First Aid Training provides the candidates with an understanding of the aviation environment and the management of medical incidents in the work place. The course provides knowledge to handle in flight medical incidents until medical assistance arrives.
 Loadmaster course prepares the participants to accomplish the loading and off loading of aircraft; perform pre-flight and post-flight checks of the aircraft and review and check aircraft systems. The course also teaches computing weight and balance and mission specific qualification duties. Students are taught safety and comfort of passengers and troops, and security of cargo, mail, and baggage during flight.
 Management of Aviation Safety & Accident Investigation course provides the students with the knowledge to manage the administration of Aviation Safety Organization and the Aircraft Accident Investigation Board. The course teaches the process of Aircraft Accident Investigations. Along with class room studies a practical exercise on a simulated air accident is conducted.
 Marshalling & Signaling (Ramp Safety) course provides the students with knowledge to assuming their responsibilities as supervisor/manager in handling the aircraft on ground. 
 Ops Room Management Military Base & Sqd course provides the students with knowledge to manage a military operation at the Base or Squadron level. This course also covers the Risk Management in the military.
 Survival Course teaches use and care of survival equipment, competencies of the aircrew to survive at sea, in the desert and mountains, with the help of basic and advanced survival training after ejection from a fighter aircraft or ditching or bailing out from transport aircraft/helicopters.

Airline courses:
 Aircraft Fuelling (Fire Prevention and Safety Measures) course trains personnel in aircraft fueling fire prevention and safety measures. It looks at the aerodrome authority, the aircraft operator and the fuelling organisation each having responsibilities in respect of the safety measures to be taken during fuelling operations.
 Airside / Ramp Safety Management course train personnel at an advanced level of airside management, taking regulations of ICAO and recommended practices of IATA into consideration. It focuses on how to manage the airside apron effectively and efficiently with the reduction of danger to personnel and property. 
 Airside Safety Accident Investigation course trains personnel on the investigation of accidents to aircraft/vehicles on the airside in accordance with ICAO and IATA regulations; covering investigation techniques, accident reporting forms and Human Factor. It identifies the difference between an accident, incident and near miss and their consequences.
 Aviation Risk Management course trains personnel to assess risk in the aviation industry. It outlines how to identify risk, assess risk, analyzing safety control measures, implementing safety control and how to monitor and review.
 AVSEC Ground Operations course is designed with collaboration and practices of ICAO aviation security program. Security conventions and Annex 17 are discussed along with new regulations and high security measures in place after September 11. The course states the requirements required of member states to enable the safe transport of passengers, crew and baggage as well as property.
 Customer Services course train personnel in the importance of a customer-centric organization. It shows how to deal with an upset customer or complaint. Its main focus is to differentiate between quantity and quality of service provided.
 Determining Aircraft Ground Times/Aviation Safety & Security Ground Times course studies the IATA Airport Handling Manual (AHM) and focuses on how to set an aircraft minimum ground time along with its advantages and disadvantages. It will help full service carriers to reduce costs and low-cost carriers to minimise their ground times.
 Human Factor in Ground Operations course identifies the human factor aspect of ground operation.
 Introduction to Dangerous Goods Regulation course provides training for flight and cabin crew in the management of dangerous goods. It covers the transport of dangerous goods by air.
 Safety Management Systems (SMS) course train personnel in the advance levels of Safety Management. This course meets the requirements of ICAO.
 Time Management trains personnel to understand the importance of time. The three-day course focuses on the day-to-day operation and living of an individual. The course will help frontline staff as well as middle management to manage their time and control their priorities more effectively and efficiently.

References

External links
 

Aviation schools